Riadh Ben-Khemais Bouazizi (born 8 April 1973) is a Tunisian former professional footballer who played as a central midfielder.

Bouazizi started his career with Étoile du Sahel where he amassed over 200 league appearances. He played for Turkish clubs Bursaspor, Gaziantepspor and Kayseri Erciyesspor in the Süper Lig before finishing ending his career with CA Bizertin.

He has 83 caps for the Tunisia national team, and was called up to the 2006 World Cup. He also played at the World Cups in 1998 and 2002. In addition, he was on the winning Tunisian team at the 2004 African Cup of Nations.

International goals
Scores and results list Tunisia's goal tally first, score column indicates score after each Bouazizi goal.

Honours
Tunisia
 Africa Cup of Nations: 2004

References

External links

1973 births
Living people
People from Djerba
Tunisian footballers
Tunisia international footballers
Association football midfielders
Olympic footballers of Tunisia
Footballers at the 1996 Summer Olympics
1996 African Cup of Nations players
1998 African Cup of Nations players
2000 African Cup of Nations players
2002 African Cup of Nations players
2004 African Cup of Nations players
2006 Africa Cup of Nations players
1998 FIFA World Cup players
2002 FIFA World Cup players
2006 FIFA World Cup players
Süper Lig players
Étoile Sportive du Sahel players
Bursaspor footballers
Gaziantepspor footballers
Kayseri Erciyesspor footballers
CA Bizertin players
Tunisian expatriate footballers
Expatriate footballers in Turkey